Santo Antônio do Rio Abaixo is a Brazilian municipality located in the state of Minas Gerais. The city belongs to the mesoregion of Belo Horizonte and to the microregion of Conceição do Mato Dentro. The estimated population in 2020 was 1,760 inhabitants.

History
Santo Antônio do Rio Abaixo came about with its clusters of houses occupying a space between the rough edges of an auriferous river and the slopes of small hills. The expedition that founded Santo Antônio do Rio Abaixo consisted of families of Portuguese explorers Duarte and Alvarenga. The pioneers started mining gold in the lands of the Morro Grande Farm, building, on the right bank of a river, a chapel to St. Anthony and also their huts, thus forming a small village. Because it was built following the currents of water, it was named Santo Antônio do Rio Abaixo. Later, it increased to a town and became a district of Conceição do Mato Dentro, on January 4, 1875. Emancipated on March 1, 1963.

Foundation
In 1695, the pioneer Borba Gato discovers gold in Sabara. Then, Borba Gato explores the Santo Antônio river in the city of Ferros, where fixed residence (town Borba Gato). With it, other explorers came and were found in abundance, alluvial gold in the Santo Antônio river, secure residences in its right edge, giving rise to the camp of Santo Antônio do Rio Abaixo. In the year 1787, with a population fixed the River St. Anthony, estimated upwards of 400 people, José Ferreira Santiago, asked Queen Maria I of Portugal permission to raise a chapel which would serve him and his neighbours. His request was accepted on March 10, 1788.

Emancipation
The creation of the Santo Antônio do Rio Abaixo occurred on December 30, 1962. The installation also occurred on March 1, 1963. On June 30, there were the first elections for mayor, deputy mayor and the aldermen of the City Council, being sworn in on September 3, 1963.

Geography
Located in the Doce river ("Rio Doce) basin, Santo Antônio do Rio Abaixo is 190 km from Belo Horizonte, by the MG-010, BR-381 and BR-120. Situated between the hills and mountains, it is a typical small town in Minas Gerais, although since the 1980s it has lost much of its older architecture. The latest architectural losses were the mill at the entrance of the city and parish house, colonial-style house, which, beside the church, was certainly the oldest house in town. Currently, the oldest buildings are restricted to the mansions of the farms around the city.

The highest point near the urban area is the Mount Cristal, with 897m of altitude. The Santo Antônio river is the main river of the city and its waters with rapids are the major attraction of the city. The wastewater produced by the city still is not treated and is discharged raw in Santo Antônio River.

Within the limits of the municipality, there is the Peixe River, which cascades and waterfalls attract many tourists every year.

Administration
 Mayor: Marluce Oliveira Duarte
 Vice-mayor: Jairo Duarte Azevedo
 Speaker of the house: Antônio Andrade de Oliveira

Quarters
 Quarter Centro (Beira d'água)
 Quarter Boa Vista
 Quarter Cidade Nova

Public parks
 Avenues

 Avenue Manuel Oliveira Santos
 Avenue Valdir Alvarenga Quintão

 Squares

 Square Alcino Quintão
 Square Joaquim Coelho de Sousa

 Streets
 Street Nelson Edson Porto
 Street Horácio Bittencourt
 Street Major Quintão
 Street Silvestre da Costa Lage
 Street Mestra Josefina Augusta dos Santos
 Street Joaquim Duarte Neto
 Street Joaquim Pereira Chaves
 Street João Paulo de Andrade
 Street Damaso de Azevedo
 Street José Camilo Rodrigues
 Street Antônio de Oliveira Quintão
 Street Dácio de Oliveira Quintão
 Street Bento Oliveira de Araújo
 Street José de Sousa Gomes

Tourism
Santo Antônio do Rio Abaixo has many tourist attractions:

Waterfalls
 Cristal Falls
 Chuvisco Falls
 Bahia Falls
 Angico Falls
 Martins Leite Falls
 Limão Falls
 Ribeirão Falls
 Domingo Falls

Fluvial beaches

 Benedito Martins Leite Balneal
 Tabuleiro beach
 Vieiras beach

Natural pools
 Limão Pool
 Domingo Pool

Farms

 Barra dos Menezes Farm
 Bambus Farm
 Maracujá Farm
 Morro Grande Farm
 Engenho Farm
 Pintas Farm
 Chapada Farm
 Fonseca Farm
 Engenho Velho Farm
 São Geraldo Farm
 Claras Farm

 Sites

 Córrego das Lages site
 Bahia site
 Córrego das Chaves site
 Paraguay site
 Morro Grande site
 Barra dos Menezes site
 Quilombo site

See also
 List of municipalities in Minas Gerais

References

External linkings

 Official page
 Page of the City Hall

Populated places established in 1962
Municipalities in Minas Gerais